Ali Abadak or Aliabadak may refer to:
 Ali Abadak, Razavi Khorasan
 Aliabadak, Razavi Khorasan
 Aliabadak, Yazd